Khalid Usman (born 1 March 1986) is a Pakistani cricketer. He was the leading wicket-taker for Water and Power Development Authority in the 2018–19 Quaid-e-Azam One Day Cup, with thirteen dismissals in eight matches. In January 2021, he was named as the captain of Khyber Pakhtunkhwa for the 2020–21 Pakistan Cup.

References

External links
 

1986 births
Living people
Pakistani cricketers
Abbottabad cricketers
Baluchistan cricketers
Khyber Pakhtunkhwa cricketers
Peshawar Zalmi cricketers
Water and Power Development Authority cricketers